Viking Adventures is an anthology of historical fiction short stories and poetry edited by D. M. Ritzlin, the third in a trio of adventure anthologies, each focusing on a different genre. It was first published in trade paperback and ebook by DMR Books in August 2021.

Summary
The book collects six short works of fiction and two poems by various authors, all set in the Viking Age.

Contents
"The Teuton's Battle-song" (poem) (from The United Amateur, Feb. 1916) (H. P. Lovecraft)
"The Trader and the Vikings" (from Jack London's Adventure Magazine, Oct. 1958) (Poul Anderson)
"The Regent of the North" (from The Theosophical Path, Aug. 1915) (Kenneth Morris)
"The Valkyries" (from The Valkyries: A Romance Founded on Wagner's Opera, 1903) (E. F. Benson)
"The Passing of Sweyn" (from Short Stories, Jul. 1908) (Ray Wynn)
"Seanachas" (from The Washer of the Ford and Other Legendary Moralites, 1896) (Fiona Macleod)
"Vengeance" (from Adventure, Jun. 30, 1925) (Arthur Gilchrist Brodeur)
"Ragnarok" (poem) (from Weird Tales, Jun. 1937) (Henry Kuttner)

Notes

2021 anthologies
Fantasy anthologies
Works set in the Viking Age
DMR Books books